The Bohai Strait Tunnel or Dalian-Yantai Tunnel is a proposed undersea tunnel construction project across the Bohai Strait to connect Dalian on the Liaodong Peninsula with Yantai on the Shandong Peninsula.  The official name for the project is  Bohai Strait Cross-Sea Traffic Way.

This would exceed the combined lengths of the two longest undersea tunnels on Earth, the Seikan Tunnel and the Channel Tunnel. The tunnel is planned to run more than  under the Strait.

Operated by China Railway Engineering Corporation, the tunnel would be linked to the Chinese high speed railway system. Cars would be loaded on railway carriages to make the 40-minute crossing. Currently, the Bohai Train Ferry, inaugurated in 2007, crosses the strait in eight hours.

The project was estimated to cost 200 billion yuan (US$32 billion). In August 2014, it was reported that work is likely to commence during the 13th Five-year plan and construction would take ten years to complete.

As of March 2018, the central government now wants to get construction underway on this bay connection 'as soon as possible'.

Plans were formally submitted to the National Development and Reform Commission (NRDC) for approval in May 2019. The project would include bridges from Penglai linking the Changshan Islands, then a tunnel under the main Bohai Strait, for a total length of 125 km. If construction was started in 2020, the opening date would be in the early 2030s. The estimated budget has risen to 300 billion  yuan (US$43 billion).

See also
 Hong Kong–Zhuhai–Macau Bridge
 Taiwan Strait Tunnel Project
 Qiongzhou Strait tunnel
 Seikan Tunnel
 Japan–Korea Undersea Tunnel

References

Bohai Sea
Proposed rail infrastructure in China
Proposed undersea tunnels in Asia
Rail transport in Dalian
Rail transport in Shandong
Proposed railway tunnels in Asia